Strange Friend is the third studio album by Scottish indie rock band The Phantom Band, released on 2 June 2014 through Chemikal Underground Records.

Track listing

Personnel
Duncan Marquiss
Gerry Hart
Andy Wake
Rick Anthony
Iain Stewart
Greg Sinclair

References

The Phantom Band albums
2014 albums
Chemikal Underground albums
Albums with cover art by Robert Beatty (artist)